Luis Horna was the defending champion, but retired due to a right leg injury, in the first round against Gastón Gaudio.

Juan Ignacio Chela won in the final 6–3, 7–6(7–2), against Carlos Moyá.

Seeds

Draw

Finals

Top half

Bottom half

External links
Draw
Qualifying draw

2007 Abierto Mexicano Telcel
Abierto Mexicano Telcel